Nozomi Seijiro Kimura Heredia ( Kimura Nozomi, born 23 January 1997) is a Chilean Japanese footballer who currently plays for Santiago Morning as centre back.

Club career
In 2014, aged 17, he was promoted to Santiago Morning’s first-adult team. Since that year he has played as starter during three years at the Primera B (second-tier).

International career
In 2017, he was called up to under-20 national team by coach Héctor Robles to face the South American Youth Championship at Ecuador. He made his debut one day after his 20th birthday, on 24 January, against Paraguay.

Personal life
His paternal great-grandfather Seijiro was the first of his family in came from Japan, arriving the first time to Talcahuano and then definitely settling at Santiago where was born Nozomi's grandfather José Guillermo and his father José Luis.

In November 2016, Kimura starred in Somos Chile (We are Chile), a web series created by the ANFP which reflects the process of multiculturalism that Chile has been going through that decade, in hopes to combat forms of discrimination such as racism and xenophobia. In the series, Kimura revealed that he was sometimes bullied by his teammates due to his Japanese name.

References

External links
 
 Nozomi Kimura at playmakerstats.com (English version of ceroacero.es)
 

1997 births
Living people
Chilean people of Japanese descent
Chilean footballers
Santiago Morning footballers
O'Higgins F.C. footballers
Cobreloa footballers
Primera B de Chile players
Chilean Primera División players
Association football defenders
Footballers from Santiago